Schnepf is a surname. Notable people with the surname include:

Erhard Schnepf (1495–1558), German Lutheran theologian 
Ryszard Schnepf (born 1951), Polish politician, former Ambassador of Poland to the United States